Sören von Rönne (born 13 July 1962) is a German former equestrian. He competed in two events at the 1992 Summer Olympics.

References

External links
 

1962 births
Living people
German male equestrians
Olympic equestrians of Germany
Equestrians at the 1992 Summer Olympics
People from Uetersen
Sportspeople from Schleswig-Holstein